Kohei Yasumi (born November 27, 1978) is a Japanese mixed martial artist. He competed in the Lightweight division.

Mixed martial arts record

|-
| Loss
| align=center| 6-7-2
| Ganjo Tentsuku
| TKO (punches)
| Shooto 2006: 9/8 in Korakuen Hall
| 
| align=center| 1
| align=center| 2:46
| Tokyo, Japan
| 
|-
| Loss
| align=center| 6-6-2
| Jani Lax
| Submission (guillotine choke)
| Shooto: Wanna Shooto 2004
| 
| align=center| 2
| align=center| 3:25
| Tokyo, Japan
| 
|-
| Loss
| align=center| 6-5-2
| Yoichi Fukumoto
| Decision (unanimous)
| Shooto 2004: 7/4 in Kitazawa Town Hall
| 
| align=center| 3
| align=center| 5:00
| Setagaya, Tokyo, Japan
| 
|-
| Loss
| align=center| 6-4-2
| Kotetsu Boku
| Decision (unanimous)
| Shooto 2004: 1/24 in Korakuen Hall
| 
| align=center| 3
| align=center| 5:00
| Tokyo, Japan
| 
|-
| Loss
| align=center| 6-3-2
| Luiz Firmino
| Decision (unanimous)
| Shooto: 9/5 in Korakuen Hall
| 
| align=center| 3
| align=center| 5:00
| Tokyo, Japan
| 
|-
| Win
| align=center| 6-2-2
| Takeshi Yamazaki
| KO (punches)
| Shooto: 2/23 in Korakuen Hall
| 
| align=center| 1
| align=center| 1:21
| Tokyo, Japan
| 
|-
| Loss
| align=center| 5-2-2
| Yves Edwards
| KO (punch)
| HOOKnSHOOT: New Wind
| 
| align=center| 1
| align=center| 1:20
| Evansville, Indiana, United States
| 
|-
| Win
| align=center| 5-1-2
| Daisuke Sugie
| Submission (guillotine choke)
| Shooto: Gig Central 1
| 
| align=center| 1
| align=center| 3:31
| Nagoya, Aichi, Japan
| 
|-
| Win
| align=center| 4-1-2
| Henry Matamoros
| Decision (unanimous)
| Shooto: Treasure Hunt 2
| 
| align=center| 3
| align=center| 5:00
| Setagaya, Tokyo, Japan
| 
|-
| Loss
| align=center| 3-1-2
| Ryan Bow
| Decision (unanimous)
| Shooto: To The Top 2
| 
| align=center| 3
| align=center| 5:00
| Tokyo, Japan
| 
|-
| Win
| align=center| 3-0-2
| Chikara Miyake
| Decision (unanimous)
| Shooto: R.E.A.D. 6
| 
| align=center| 2
| align=center| 5:00
| Tokyo, Japan
| 
|-
| Win
| align=center| 2-0-2
| Yohei Nanbu
| Decision (majority)
| Shooto: R.E.A.D. 1
| 
| align=center| 2
| align=center| 5:00
| Tokyo, Japan
| 
|-
| Draw
| align=center| 1-0-2
| Masakazu Kuramochi
| Draw
| Shooto: Renaxis 4
| 
| align=center| 2
| align=center| 5:00
| Tokyo, Japan
| 
|-
| Draw
| align=center| 1-0-1
| Satoshi Fujisaki
| Draw
| Shooto: Renaxis 1
| 
| align=center| 2
| align=center| 5:00
| Tokyo, Japan
| 
|-
| Win
| align=center| 1-0
| Koji Takeuchi
| Decision (unanimous)
| Shooto: Shooter's Soul
| 
| align=center| 2
| align=center| 5:00
| Setagaya, Tokyo, Japan
|

See also
List of male mixed martial artists

References

External links
 

1978 births
Japanese male mixed martial artists
Lightweight mixed martial artists
Mixed martial artists utilizing wrestling
Mixed martial artists utilizing kickboxing
Living people